The 2008–09 Alabama–Huntsville Chargers ice hockey team represented the University of Alabama in Huntsville in the 2008–09 NCAA Division I men's ice hockey season. The Chargers were coached by Danton Cole who was in his second season as head coach. The Chargers played their home games in the Von Braun Center and were members of the College Hockey America conference.

Roster

|}

Regular season

Schedule

Standings

Statistics

Skaters

Goalies

References

Alabama Huntsville
Alabama–Huntsville Chargers men's ice hockey seasons
Ala